James William George Horton (6 January 1907 – July 1972) was an English professional footballer who played as a forward for Aldershot, Millwall and Southampton in the 1920s and 1930s.

Football career
Horton was born in Aldershot and qualified as an electrician. After playing for various works teams, he started his football career when he joined Woking of the Isthmian League in October 1928. After scoring five goals on his debut and three in his next match, he was soon offered a contract with Aldershot Town of the Southern League, who he joined in November.

At Aldershot, he scored 27 goals in 26 appearances in 1928–29, following this with 31 league goals in only 21 games in the next season, before joining Millwall, of the Football League Second Division for a fee of £1,000 in January 1930.

At Millwall, Horton was in and out of the side over the next four and a half years, managing only 49 league appearances with eight goals before transferring to fellow Second Division club, Southampton, for a £500 fee in September 1934.

At The Dell, Horton was used as cover and made only four first-team appearances, in three different forward positions, in the 1934–35 season. Horton was considered "a bit of a character" and would change into his playing kit, but only remove his bowler hat at the moment of leaving the dressing room.

After a season with the Saints, Horton returned to Aldershot, but a leg injury forced him to retire from professional football without making a Football League appearance for the club.

Later career
After the Second World War, Horton found employment as the groundsman at Aldershot's Recreation Ground stadium.

Family
Horton's son, Billy, played for Aldershot in the 1960s; James' grandson, Jamie, was on the books of Farnborough Town in the 1990s.

References

1907 births
1972 deaths
Sportspeople from Aldershot
English footballers
Woking F.C. players
Aldershot F.C. players
Millwall F.C. players
Southampton F.C. players
Southern Football League players
English Football League players
Association football forwards
Footballers from Hampshire
20th-century British Army personnel
Royal Engineers soldiers
Military personnel from Hampshire